Israel Luna may refer to:
 Israel Luna (filmmaker)
 Israel Luna (footballer)